Bithynia longicornis is a species of freshwater snail with a gill and an operculum, an aquatic gastropod mollusk in the family Bithyniidae.

Distribution
The distribution of this species includes:
 China

Ecology
Bithynia longicornis is the first intermediate host for:
 trematode Clonorchis sinensis

References

External links

Bithyniidae
Taxa named by William Henry Benson